Alston Rivers Ltd. was a London publishing firm. The firm originally consisted of the Hon L.J. Bathurst and R.B. Byles and had brought out the novels of Whyte Melville and the Gilbert and Sullivan operas. In 1904 it was reconstituted, with Bathurst and Archibald Marshall putting up the money and Byles as business manager and partner. They published a range of works including travel books, poetry and novels.  They published from Brooke St, Holborn Bars, and in 1905 moved to 13 Arundel St. They continued publishing books until 1930.

References

Publishing companies of the United Kingdom